Justa Grata Honoria, commonly referred to during her lifetime as Honoria, (born c. 418 – died c. 455) was the older sister of the Western Roman Emperor Valentinian III. She is famous for her plea of love and help to Attila the Hun, which led to his proclamation of his claim to rule the Western Roman Empire.

Coins attest that she was granted the title of Augusta not long after the accession of her brother in 426.

Family
Honoria was the only daughter of later Emperor Constantius III and Galla Placidia. Her first two names were after her maternal aunts, Justa and Grata, the daughters of Valentinian I and Justina, and the third for the emperor who reigned at the time of her birth, her half-uncle Honorius. Her maternal half-brother Theodosius, born in 414 from the first marriage of Placidia to king Ataulf of the Visigoths, died in infancy, before Honoria was born. Her younger brother, Valentinian III, was her full brother.

Biography
The historical record of most of her life is little more than brief mentions of or allusions to her presence. Oost notes that she accompanied her mother and younger brother as they set sail for Constantinople in spring of 423, and that Honoria was with them when they joined the expeditionary force at Thessalonica in the summer of 424 that would restore Galla Placidia and Valentinian to power in the West. She was included in mosaics of the Imperial family, now lost, at Santa Croce in Gerusalemme and in a church dedicated to Saint John the Evangelist in Ravenna. Last is Carmen I of Merobaudes written circa 443, although a fragmentary poem it clearly includes her in a description of the family of Valentinian III. These details have led Stewart Oost to observe that Honoria came to feel "that life had condemned her to a dull and impotent backwater."

Honoria gained a reputation with older historians of being ambitious and promiscuous, using her sexuality to advance her interests. She regarded her brother as weak and indolent, based on the events of a brief period in her life. According to John of Antioch (writing in the 7th century), she seduced her chamberlain, Eugenius, but their affair was discovered. According to the Chronicle of Marcellinus Comes, Honoria was sent to a convent in Constantinople; J. B. Bury has  argued that her relegation to Constantinople never happened, pointing out that Marcellinus matched the indiction of the event to the wrong pair of consuls, putting this event 15 years too early.

Whether one agrees with Bury or not, it is certain that her brother decided to marry Honoria to a Roman senator named Bassus Herculanus who was considered "safe" and unlikely to use this connection to seize the throne. Faced with this unwanted marriage, Honoria sought the aid of Attila the Hun. She sent the Hunnish king a plea for help – and her ring – in the spring of 450. Though Honoria may not have intended a proposal of marriage, Bury points out Attila chose to interpret her message as such. He accepted, asking for half of the western Empire as dowry. When Valentinian discovered the plan, again only the influence of his mother Galla Placidia convinced him to exile, rather than kill, Honoria. He also wrote to Attila strenuously denying the legitimacy of the supposed marriage proposal.

For years Attila had been planning to invade Rome and Honoria's letter gave him the excuse to make his move. Attila sent an emissary to Ravenna in 451 to proclaim that Honoria was innocent, that the proposal had been legitimate, and that he would come to claim what was rightfully his. Attila made a similar demand in 452, which was followed by his failed invasion of northern Italy.

Nothing of her life after her intrigue with Attila is recorded. One assumes that she was married to Herculanus, but in concluding his account of this incident, John of Antioch writes, "And so Honoria was freed from her danger at this time." Pointing at the last three words of this sentence, Bury asks, "Does this imply that she incurred some punishment afterwards, worse even than a dull marriage?" Lastly, because her name does not appear in the list of important persons carried off to Carthage by the Vandals following their sack of the city, the capture of her sister-in-law and her nieces and the murder of her brother in 455, Oost suggests she was dead by then; whether of natural causes or by order of her brother the Emperor, Oost admits "we do not have evidence adequate" to decide.

Portrayals

 She was portrayed by Sophia Loren in the 1954 film Attila.
 She was portrayed by Kirsty Mitchell in the 2001 miniseries Attila.
 She was portrayed by Ivelina Ivanova in the 2016 docudrama Barbarians Rising.

References

External links

Justa Grata Honoria - Article by J. B. Bury
 Scheming princess behind Empire's fall - Article from CNN by Mark S. Longo.

5th-century births
5th-century deaths
Theodosian dynasty
5th-century Romans
5th-century Roman women
Augustae
Daughters of Roman emperors